Winston is a census-designated place in Sierra County, New Mexico, United States. Its population was 61 as of the 2010 census.  Winston has a post office with ZIP code 87943, which opened on August 15, 1881. The community was named for Frank Winston, a pioneer miner. New Mexico State Road 52 passes through the community.

Geography

Demographics

Education
Truth or Consequences Municipal Schools is the school district for the entire county. Truth or Consequences Middle School and Hot Springs High School, both in Truth or Consequences, are the district's secondary schools.

References

External links
Winston on the Sierra County Tourism website

Census-designated places in New Mexico
Census-designated places in Sierra County, New Mexico
1881 establishments in New Mexico Territory